This is a chronologically organized listing of notable zoological events and discoveries.

Ancient world 
28000 BC. Cave paintings (e.g. Chauvet Cave) in southern France and northern Spain depict animals in a stylized fashion. These European cave paintings depict Mammoths (the same species is later seen thawed ice in Siberia).
10000 BC. Humans (Homo sapiens) domesticated dogs, pigs, sheep, goats, fowl, and other animals in Europe, northern Africa and the Near East.
6500 BC. The aurochs, ancestors of domestic cattle, were domesticated in the next two centuries if not earlier (Obre I, Yugoslavia). This was the last major animal to be tamed as a source of milk, meat, power, and leather in the Old World.

3500 BC. Sumerian animal-drawn wheeled vehicles and plows were developed in Mesopotamia, the region called the "Fertile Crescent". Irrigation was probably done using animal power. Since Sumeria had no natural defenses, armies with mounted cavalry and chariots became important, increasing the importance of equines (horses and donkeys).
2000 BC. Domestication of the silkworm in China.
1100 BC. Won Chang (China), first of the Zhou emperors, stocked his imperial zoological garden with deer, goats, birds, and fish from many parts of the world. The emperor also enjoyed sporting events with the use of animals.
850 BC. Homer (Greek) wrote the epics Iliad and Odyssey, which both contain animals as monsters and metaphors (gross soldiers turned into pigs by the witch Circe), but also some correct observations on bees and fly maggots. Both epics make reference to mules.
610 BC. Anaximander (Greek, 610 BC–545 BC) was a student of Thales of Miletus. He taught that the first life was formed by spontaneous generation in the mud. Later animals came into being by transmutations, left the water, and reached dry land. Man was derived from lower animals, probably aquatic. His writings, especially his poem On Nature, were read and cited by Aristotle and other later philosophers, but are lost.
563? BC. Buddha (Indian, 563?–483 BC) had gentle ideas on the treatment of animals. Animals are held to have intrinsic worth, not just the values they derive from their usefulness to man.
500 BC. Empedocles of Agrigentum (Greek, 504–433 BC) reportedly rid a town of malaria by draining nearby swamps. He proposed the theory of the four humors and a natural origin of living things.

500 BC. Alcmaeon (Greek, c. 500 BC) performed human dissections. He identified the optic nerve, distinguished between veins and arteries, and showed that the nose was not connected to the brain. He made much of the tongue and explained how it functioned. He also gave an explanation for semen and for sleep.
500 BC. Xenophanes (Greek, 576–460 BC), a disciple of Pythagoras (?–497 BC), first recognized fossils as animal remains and inferred that their presence on mountains indicated the latter had once been beneath the sea. "If horses or oxen had hands and could draw or make statues, horses would represent the forms of gods as horses, oxen as oxen." Galen (130?–201?) revived interest in fossils that had been rejected by Aristotle, and the speculations of Xenophanes were again viewed with favor.
470 BC. Democritus of Abdera (Greek, 470–370 BC) made dissections of many animals and humans. He was the first Greek philosopher-scientist to propose a classification of animals, dividing them into blooded animals (Vertebrata) and bloodless animals (Evertebrata). He also held that lower animals had perfected organs and that the brain was the seat of thought.
460 BC. Hippocrates (Greek, 460?–377? BC), the "Father of Medicine", used animal dissections to advance human anatomy.
440 BC. Herodotus of Halikarnassos (Greek, 484–425 BC) treated exotic fauna in his Historia, but his accounts are often based on tall tales. He explored the Nile, but much of ancient Egyptian civilization was already lost to living memory by his time.
384 BC. Aristotle's (Greek, 384–322 BC) books Historia Animalium (9 books), and  set the zoological stage for centuries. He emphasized the value of direct observation, recognized law and order in biological phenomena, and derived conclusions inductively from observations. He believed that there was a natural scale of animals that ran from simple to complex. He made advances in marine biology, basing his writings on keen observation and rational interpretation as well as conversations with local Lesbos fishermen for two years, beginning in 344 BC. His account of male protection of eggs by the barking catfish was scorned for centuries until Louis Agassiz confirmed Aristotle's description.
340 BC. Plato (Greek, 427–347 BC) held that animals existed to serve man, but they should not be mistreated because this would lead people to mistreat other people. Others who have echoed this opinion are St. Thomas Aquinas, Immanuel Kant, and Albert Schweitzer.

323 BC. Alexander the Great (Macedonian, 356–323 BC) collected animals when he was not busy conquering the known world. He is credited with the introduction of the peacock into Europe.
70 BC. Publius Vergilius Maro (Virgil) (70–19 BC) was a famous Roman poet. His poems Bucolics (42–37 BC) and Georgics (37–30 BC) hold much information on animal husbandry and farm life. His Aeneid (published posthumously) has many references to the zoology of his time.
36 BC. Marcus Terentius Varro (116–27 BC) wrote , a treatise that includes apiculture. He also treated the problem of sterility in the mule and recorded a rare instance in which a fertile mule was bred.
50. Lucius Annaeus Seneca (Roman, 4 BC–AD 65), tutor to Roman emperor Nero, maintained that animals have no reason, just instinct, a "stoic" position.

77. Pliny the Elder (Roman, 23–79) wrote his  in 37 volumes. This work is a catch-all of zoological folklore, superstitions, and some good observations.
79. Pliny the Younger (Roman, 62–113), nephew of Pliny the Elder, inherited his uncle's notes and wrote on beekeeping.
100. Plutarch (Roman, 46?–120) stated that animals' behavior is motivated by reason and understanding.
131. Galen of Pergamum (Greek, 131?–201?), physician to Roman Emperor Marcus Aurelius, wrote on human anatomy from dissections of animals. His texts were used for hundreds of years, gaining the reputation of infallibility.
200 c. Animals were believed to exist in order to serve man, if not as food or slaves then as moral examples.
Early third century. Composition of De Natura Animalium by Claudius Aelianus

Middle Ages

600 c. Isidorus Hispalensis (Spanish bishop of Seville) (560–636) wrote , an encyclopedic compendium of ancient knowledge including information on animals that served until the rediscovery of Aristotle and Pliny. Full of errors, it nevertheless was influential for hundreds of years. He also wrote .
781. Al-Jahiz (Afro-Arab, 781–868/869), a scholar at Basra, wrote on the influence of environment on animals.
901. Horses came into wider use in those parts of Europe where the three-field system produces grain surpluses for feed, but hay-fed oxen were more economical, if less efficient, in terms of time and labor and remained almost the sole source of animal power in southern Europe, where most farmers continued to use the two-field system.
1225-1244. Thomas of Cantimpré‚ (Fleming, 1204?–1275?) wrote , a major 13th-century encyclopedia.

1244–1248. Frederick II von Hohenstaufen (Holy Roman Emperor) (1194–1250) wrote  (The Art of Hunting with Birds) as a practical guide to ornithology.

1244. Vincentius Bellovacensis (Vincent of Beauvais) (?–1264) wrote  (1244–1254), a major encyclopedia of the 13th century. This work comprises three huge volumes, of 80 books and 9,885 chapters.
1254–1323. Marco Polo (Italian, 1254–1323) provided information on Asiatic fauna, revealing new animals to Europeans. "Unicorns" (which may actually have been rhinos) were reported from southern China, but fantastic animals were otherwise not included.
1255–1270. Albertus Magnus of Cologne (Bavarian, 1206?–1280) (Albert von Bollstaedt or St. Albert) wrote . He promoted Aristotle but also included new material on the perfection and intelligence of animals, especially bees.
1304–1309. Petrus de Crescentii wrote , a practical manual for agriculture with many accurate observations on insects and other animals. Apiculture was discussed at length.

1492. Christopher Columbus (Italian) arrives in the New World. New animals soon begin to overload European zoology. Columbus is said to have introduced cattle, horses, and eight pigs from the Canary Islands to Hispaniola in 1493, giving rise to virtual devastation of that and other islands. Pigs were often set ashore by sailors to provide food on the ship's later return. Feral populations of hogs were often dangerous to humans.
1519–1520. Bernal Diaz del Castillo (Spanish, 1450?–1500), chronicler of Cortez's conquest of Mexico, commented on the zoological gardens of Aztec ruler Montezuma (1466–1520), a marvel with parrots, rattlesnakes, and other animals.
1523. Gonzalo Fernández de Oviedo y Valdés(Spanish, 1478–1557), appointed official historiographer of the Indies in 1523, wrote Sumario de la Natural Historia delas Indias (Toledo, 1527). He was the first to describe many New World animals, such as the tapir, opossum, manatee, iguana, armadillo, anteaters, sloth, pelican, and hummingbirds.

Modern world

1551–1555. This latter work included 110 animal species and offered many new observations and corrections to Herodotus. (1555) was his picture book, with improved animal classification and accurate anatomical drawings. In this he published a man's and a bird's skeleton side by side to show the resemblance. He discovered an armadillo shell in a market in Syria, showing how Muslims were distributing the finds from the New World.
1551. Conrad Gessner (Swiss, 1516–1565) wrote  (Tiguri, 4 vols., 1551–1558, last volume published in 1587) and gained renown. This work, although uncritically compiled in places, was consulted for over 200 years.
1552  Edward Wotton (English, 1492–1555) published , a work that influenced Gessner.
1554–1555. He gathered vernacular names in hope of being able to identify the animal in question. He did go to print with discoveries that disagreed with Aristotle.
1578. Jean de Lery (French, 1534–1611) was a member of the French colony at Rio de Janeiro. He published  (1578) with observations on the local fauna.
1585. Thomas Harriot (English, 1560–1621) was a naturalist with the first attempted English colony in North America, on Roanoke Island, North Carolina. His Brief and True Report of the New Found Land of Virginia (1590) describes the black bear, gray squirrel, hare, otter, opossum, raccoon, skunk, Virginia and mule deer, turkeys, and horseshoe crab (Limulus).
1589.

17th century
1600. In Italy a spider scare lead to hysteria and the tarantella dance by which the body cures itself through physical exertions.
1602. Ulisse Aldrovandi (Italian, 1522–1605) wrote . This and his other works include many scientific inaccuracies, but he used wing and leg morphology to construct his classification of insects. He is more highly regarded for his ornithological contributions.
1604–1614. Francisco Hernández de Toledo (Spanish) was sent to study Mexican biota in 1593–1600, by Philip II of Spain. His notes were published in Mexico in 1604 and 1614, describing many animals to Europeans for the first time: coyote, buffalo, axolotl, porcupine, pronghorn antelope, horned lizard, bison, peccary, and the toucan. He also included figures of many animals for the first time, including the ocelot, rattlesnake, manatee, alligator, armadillo, and pelican.
1607 (1612?). Captain John Smith (English), head of the Jamestown colony, wrote A Map of Virginia in which he describes the physical features of the country, its climate, plants and animals, and inhabitants. He describes the raccoon, muskrat, flying squirrel, and other animals.
1617. Garcilaso de la Vega (Peruvian Spanish, 1539–1617) wrote Royal Commentaries of Peru, containing descriptions of the condor, ocelots, puma, viscacha, tapir, rhea, skunk, llama, huanaco, paca, and vicuña.
1620? North American colonists probably introduced the European honeybee, Apis mellifera, into Virginia. By the 1640s these insects were also in Massachusetts. They became feral and advanced through eastern North America before the settlers.
1628. William Harvey (English, 1578–1657) published  (1628) with the doctrine of the circulation of blood (an inference made by him in about 1616).
1634. William Wood (English) wrote New England Prospect (1634) in which he describes New England's fauna.
1637. Thomas Morton (English, c. 1579–1647) wrote New English Canaan (1637) with treatments of 26 species of mammals, 32 birds, 20 fishes and 8 marine invertebrates.

1648. Georg Marcgrave (?–1644) was a German astronomer working for Johann Moritz, Count Maurice of Nassau, in the Dutch colony set up in northeastern Brazil. His  (1648) contains the best early descriptions of many Brazilian animals. Marcgrave used Tupi names that were later Latinized by Linnaeus in the 13th edition of the Systema Naturae. The biological and linguistic data could have come from Moraes, a Brazilian Jesuit priest turned apostate.
1651. William Harvey published  (1651) with the aphorism  on the title page.
1661. Marcello Malpighi (Italian, 1628–1694) discovered capillaries (1661), structures predicted to exist by Harvey some thirty years earlier. Malpighi was the founder of microanatomy. He studied, among other things, the anatomy of the silkworm (1669) and the development of the chick (1672).
1665. Robert Hooke (English, 1635–1703) wrote Micrographia (1665, 88 plates), with his early microscopic studies. He coined the term "cell".
1668. His refutation of spontaneous generation in flies is still considered a model in experimentation.
1669. Jan Swammerdam (Dutch, 1637–1680) wrote  (1669) describing metamorphosis in insects and supporting the performation doctrine. He was a pioneer in microscopic studies. He gave the first description of red blood corpuscles and discovered the valves of lymph vessels. His work was unknown and unacknowledged until after his death.
1672. Regnier de Graaf (Dutch, 1641–1673) reported that he had traced the human egg from the ovary down the fallopian tube to the uterus. What he really saw was the follicle.
1675–1722. Antonie van Leeuwenhoek (Dutch, 1632–1723) wrote , a treatise with early observations made with microscopes. He discovered blood corpuscles, striated muscles, human spermatozoa (1677), protozoa (1674), bacteria (1683), rotifers, etc.
Martin Lister (English, 1639-1712) publishes the first work on spiders based on observation.
1691. John Ray (English, 1627–1705) wrote  (1693),  (1710), and The Wisdom of God Manifested in the Works of the Creation (1691). He tried to classify different animal species into groups largely according to their toes and teeth.
1699. Edward Tyson (English, 1650–1708) wrote  (or Anatomy of a Pygmie Compared with that of a Monkey, an Ape and a Man) (1699), his anatomical study of the primate. This was the first detailed and accurate study of the higher apes. Other studies by Tyson include the female porpoise, male rattlesnake, tapeworm, roundworm (Ascaris), peccary and opossum.

18th century
1700. Félix de Azara (Spanish) estimated the feral herds of cattle on the South American pampas at 48 million animals. These animals probably descended from herds introduced by the Jesuits some 100 years earlier. (North America and Australia were to follow in this pattern, where feral herds of cattle and mustangs would explode, become pests, and reform the frontier areas.)

1705. Maria Sybilla Merian (German, 1647–1717) wrote and illustrated her  (1705). In this book she stated that Fulgora lanternaria was luminous.
1734–1742. René Antoine Ferchault de Réaumur (French, 1683–1756) was an early entomologist. His  (6 volumes) shows the best of zoological observation at the time. He invented the glass-fronted bee hive.
1740. Abraham Trembley, Swiss naturalist, discovered the hydra which he considered to combine both animal and plant characteristics. His  (1744) showed that freshwater polyps of Hydra could be sectioned or mutilated and still reform. Regeneration soon became a topic of inquiry among Réaumur, Bonnet, Spallanzani, and others.
1745. He confirmed parthenogenesis of aphids.
1745. Pierre Louis M. de Maupertuis (French, 1698–1759) went to Lapland to measure the arc of the meridian (1736–1737). Maupertuis was a Newtonian. He generated family trees for inheritable characteristics (e.g., haemophilia in European royal families) and showed inheritance through both the male and female lines. He was an early evolutionist and head of the Berlin Academy of Sciences. In 1744 he proposed the theory that molecules from all parts of the body were gathered into the gonads (later called "pangenesis").  was published anonymously in 1745. Maupertuis wrote  in which he suggests a survival of the fittest concept: "Could not one say that since, in the accidental combination of Nature's productions, only those could survive which found themselves provided with certain appropriate relationships, it is no wonder that these relationships are present in all the species that actually exist? These species which we see today are only the smallest part of those which a blind destiny produced."
1748. John Tuberville Needham, an English naturalist, wrote Observations upon the Generation, Composition, and Decomposition of Animal and Vegetable Substances in which he offers "proof" of spontaneous generation. Needham found flasks of broth teeming with "little animals" after having boiled them and sealed them, but his experimental techniques were faulty.

1749–1804. Georges-Louis Leclerc, Comte de Buffon (French, 1707–1788) wrote  (1749–1804 in 44 vols.), which asserted that species were mutable. Buffon also drew attention to vestigial organs. He held that spermatozoa were "living organic molecules" that multiplied in the semen.
1752. Founding of the Schönbrunn Zoo in Vienna, the world's oldest continuously operating zoo.
1753. The British Museum was founded in the will of  Sir Hans Sloane (English (born Ireland), 1660–1753).  It would open its doors in 1759.
1758. Albrecht von Haller (Swiss, 1708–1777) was one of the founders of modern physiology. His work on the nervous system was revolutionary. He championed animal physiology, along with human physiology. See his textbook  (1758).
1758. Carl Linnaeus (Swedish, 1707–1778) published the  whose tenth edition (1758) is the starting point of binomial nomenclature for zoology.
1759. Caspar Friedrich Wolff (1733–1794) wrote  (1759) that disagreed with the idea of preformation. He supported the doctrine of epigenesis as a way to resolve the problem of hybrids (mule, hinny, apemen) in preformation.

1769. Edward Bancroft (English) wrote An Essay on the Natural History of Guyana in South America (1769) and advanced the theory that flies transmit disease.
1771. Johann Reinhold Forster (German, 1729–1798) was the naturalist on Cook's second voyage around the world (1772–1775). He published a Catalogue of the Animals of North America (1771) as an addendum to Kalm's Travels. He also studied the birds of Hudson Bay.
1774. Gilbert White (English) wrote The natural history and antiquities of Selborne, in the county of Southampton (1774) with fine ornithological observations on migration, territoriality, and flocking.
1775. Johan Christian Fabricius (Danish, 1745–1808) wrote  (1775),  (1776),  (1778),  (1792–1794, in six vols.), and later publications (to 1805), to make Fabricius one of the world's greatest entomologists.
1780. Lazaro Spallanzani (Italian, 1729–1799) performed artificial fertilization in the frog, silkmoth and dog. He concluded from filtration experiments that spermatozoa were necessary for fertilization. In 1783 he showed that human digestion was a chemical process since gastric juices in and outside the body liquefied food (meat). He used himself as the experimental animal. His work to disprove spontaneous generation in microbes was resisted by John Needham (English priest, 1713–1781).
1780. Antoine Lavoisier (French, 1743–1794) and Pierre Laplace (French, 1749–1827) wrote Memoir on heat. Lavoisier, the discoverer of oxygen, concluded that animal respiration was a form of combustion.

1783–1792. Alexandre Rodrigues Ferreira (Brazilian) wrote . His specimens were taken by Saint-Hilaire from Lisbon to the Paris Museum during the Napoleonic invasion of Portugal.
1784. Johann Wolfgang von Goethe (German) wrote  (1795) that promoted the idea of archetypes to which animals should be compared.
1784. Thomas Jefferson (American) wrote Notes on the State of Virginia (1784) that refuted some of Buffon's mistakes about New World fauna. As U.S. President, he dispatched the Lewis and Clark Expedition to the American West (1804).
1788. The First Fleet inaugurates British settlement of Australia. Knowledge of Australia's unique zoology, including marsupials and the platypus, would revolutionize Western zoology.
1789?
1789. George Shaw & Frederick Polydore Nodder published The Naturalist's Miscellany: or coloured figures of natural objects drawn and described immediately from nature (1789–1813) in 24 volumes with hundreds of color plates.
1792. François Huber made original observations on honeybees. In his  (1792) he noted that the first eggs laid by queen bees develop into drones if her nuptial flight had been delayed and that her last eggs would also give rise to drones. He also noted that rare worker eggs develop into drones. This anticipated by over 50 years the discovery by Jan Dzierżon that drones come from unfertilized eggs and queen and worker bees come from fertilized eggs.
1793. The National Museum of Natural History, France is founded in Paris. It became a major center of zoological research in the early nineteenth century.
1793. Lazaro Spallanzani (Italian, 1729–1799) conducted experiments on the orientation of bats and owls in the dark.
1793. Christian Konrad Sprengel (1750–1816) wrote  (1793) that was a major work on insect pollination of flowers, previously discovered in 1721 by Philip Miller (1694–1771), the head gardener at Chelsea and author of the famous Gardener's Dictionary (1731–1804).

1794. Erasmus Darwin (English, grandfather of Charles Darwin) wrote Zoönomia, or the Laws of Organic Life (1794) in which he advanced the idea that environmental influences could transform species.
1796–1829. Pierre André Latreille (French, 1762–1833) sought to provide a "natural" system for the classification of animals, in his many monographs on invertebrates.  (1811) was devoted to insects collected by Humboldt and Bonpland.
1797-1804. Publication of A History of British Birds by Thomas Bewick and Ralph Beilby in two volumes.
1798. Publication of Thomas Robert Malthus's An Essay on the Principle of Population, a book important to both Darwin and Wallace.
1799. George Shaw (English) provided the first description of the duck-billed platypus. Everard Home (1802) provided the first complete description.
1799–1803. Alexander von Humboldt (German, 1769–1859) and Aimé Jacques Alexandre Goujaud Bonpland (French) arrived in Venezuela in 1799. Humboldt's Personal Narrative of Travels to the Equinoctial Regions of America during the years 1799–1804 and Kosmos were influential in his time.
1799. Georges Cuvier (French, 1769–1832) established comparative anatomy as a field. He also founded the science of paleontology. He wrote  (1801–1805),  (1816),  (1812–1813). He believed in the fixity of species and the Biblical Flood. His early  (1798) was influential, but it did not include Cuvier's major contributions to animal classification.
1799. American hunters killed the last bison on the Eastern coast of the United States, in Pennsylvania.

19th century

1802. He was an early evolutionist and organized invertebrate paleontology. While Lamarck's contributions to science include work in meteorology, botany, chemistry, geology, and paleontology, he is best known for his work in invertebrate zoology and his theoretical work on evolution. He published a seven-volume work,  ("Natural history of animals without backbones"; 1815–1822).
1813–1818. William Charles Wells (Scottish-American, 1757–1817) was the first to recognise the principle of natural selection. He read a paper to the Royal Society in 1813 (but not published until 1818) which used the idea to explain differences between human races. The application was limited to the question of how different skin colours arose.
1815. William Kirby and William Spence (English) wrote An Introduction to Entomology (first edition in 1815). This was the first modern entomology text.
1817. Publication of American Entomology by Thomas Say, the first work devoted to American insects. A greatly expanded three-volume edition would appear 1824-1828.  Say was a systematic zoologist who moved to the utopian community at New Harmony, Indiana, in 1825. Most of his insect collections have been recovered.
1817. Georges Cuvier wrote Le Règne Animal (Paris).
1817–1820. Johann Baptist von Spix (German, 1781–1826) and Carl Friedrich Philipp von Martius (German) conducted Brazilian zoological and botanical explorations (1817–1820). See their  (3 vols., 1823–1831).
1817. William Smith, in his Strategraphical System of Organized Fossils (1817) showed that certain strata have characteristic series of fossils.
1819 William Lawrence (English, 1783–1867) published a book of his lectures to the Royal College of Surgeons. The book contains a rejection of Lamarckism (soft inheritance), proto-evolutionary ideas about the origin of mankind, and a denial of the 'Jewish scriptures' (Old Testament). He was forced to suppress the book after the Lord Chancellor refused copyright and other powerful men made threatening remarks.
1824. Publication of the French physician Henri Dutrochet's Mémoires pour servir a l'histoire anatomique et physiologique des végétaux et des animaux setting forth a physiological theory of the cell.
1824. The Royal Society for the Prevention of Cruelty to Animals (RSPCA) is founded at London.
1824. Founding of the Zoological Journal, the first English-language journal of zoology. The last issue would appear in 1834.
1825. Gideon Mantell (English) wrote "Notice on the Iguanodon, a newly discovered fossil reptile, from the sandstone of Tilgate Forest, in Sussex" (Phil. Trans. Roy, Soc. Lond., 115: 179–186), the first paper on dinosaurs. The name dinosaur was coined by anatomist Richard Owen.
1826. Founding of the Zoological Society of London.
1826–1839. John James Audubon (Haitian-born American, 1785–1851) wrote Birds of America (1826–1839), with North American bird portraits and studies. See also his posthumously published volume on North American mammals written with his sons and the naturalist John Bachman, The Viviparous Quadrupeds of North America (1845–1854) with 150 folio plates.
1827. Karl Ernst von Baer (Russian embryologist, 1792–1876) was the founder of comparative embryology. He demonstrated the existence of the mammalian ovum, and he proposed the germ-layer theory.
1828. The Zoological Society of London opens its "zoo" to the public (later known as the London Zoo) for two days a week beginning April 27, 1828, with the first hippopotamus to be seen in Europe since the ancient Romans showed one at the Colosseum. This was the first modern zoo founded for scientific research and education.
1829. James Smithson (English, 1765–1829) donated seed money in his will for the founding of the Smithsonian Institution in Washington.
1830–1833. Sir Charles Lyell (English, 1797–1875) wrote Principles of Geology and gave the time needed for evolution to work. Darwin took this book to sea on the HMS Beagle.
1830. Étienne Geoffroy Saint-Hilaire (French, 1772–1844) wrote  (1830).
1830. Founding of the Journal of Zoology, then known as Proceedings of the Zoological Society of London.
1831 Founding of the Magasin de Zoologie, the first French-language zoological journal.
1831–1836. Charles Darwin (English, 1809–1882) and Captain Robert FitzRoy (English) went to sea. Darwin's report is generally known as The Voyage of the Beagle.
1832. Thomas Nuttall (American?, 1786–1859) wrote A Manual of the Ornithology of the United States and Canada (1832) that was to become the standard text on the subject for most of the 19th century.

1835. William Swainson (English, 1789–1855) wrote A Treatise on the Geography and Classification of Animals (1835) in which he used ad hoc land bridges to explain animal distributions. He included some second-hand observations on Old World army ants.
1835. Founding of the Archiv für Naturgeschichte the premier German-language journal of natural history with an emphasis on zoology.  It would be published until 1926.
1839. Theodor Schwann (German, 1810–1882) wrote  (1839). With him the cell theory was made general.
1839. Louis Agassiz (Swiss-American, 1807–1873), an expert on fossil fishes, founded the Museum of Comparative Zoology, at Harvard University, and became Darwin's North American opposition. He was a popularizer of natural history. His  (1842–1847) was a pioneering effort.
1840. Jan Evangelista Purkyně, a Czech physiologist, at Wrocław proposes that the word "protoplasm" be applied to the formative material of young animal embryos.

1842. Baron Justus von Liebig wrote  in which he suggested that animal heat is produced by combustion, and founded the science of biochemistry.
1843. John James Audubon, age 58, ascended the Missouri River to Fort Union at the mouth of the Yellowstone to sketch wild animals.
1844. Berlin Zoo founded.
1844. Robert Chambers (Scottish, 1802–1871) wrote the Vestiges of the Natural History of Creation (1844) in which he included early evolutionary considerations. The most primitive species originated by spontaneous generation, but these gave rise to more advanced ones. This book, anonymously published, had a profound effect on Wallace.
1845. von Siebold recognized Protozoa as single-celled animals.
1848. Josiah C. Nott (American), a physician from New Orleans, published his belief that mosquitoes transmitted malaria.
1848. Alfred Russel Wallace (British, 1823–1913) and Henry W. Bates (English, 1825–1892) arrived in the Amazon River valley in 1848. Bates stayed until 1859, exploring the upper Amazon. Wallace remained in the Amazon until 1852, exploring the Rio Negro. Wallace wrote A Narrative of Travels on the Amazon and Rio Negro (1853), and Bates wrote The Naturalist on the River Amazons (1863). Later (1854–1862), Wallace went to the Far East, reported in his The Malay Archipelago (1869).
1849. Arnold Adolph Berthold demonstrated by castration and testicular transplant that the testis produces a blood-borne substance promoting male secondary sexual characteristics.
1850? Thomas Hardwicke (British naturalist) was the first European to discover the lesser panda (Ailurus fulgens) in northern India.
1855. Alfred Russel Wallace (English, 1823–1913) wrote On the law which has regulated the introduction of new species (Ann. Mag. Nat. Hist., September 1855) with evolutionary ideas that drew upon Wallace's experiences in the Amazon.
1857–1881. Henri Milne-Edwards (French, 1800–1885) introduced the idea of physiologic division of labor and wrote a treatise on comparative anatomy and physiology (1857–1881).

1859. Charles Darwin publishes On the Origin of Species, explaining the mechanism of evolution by natural selection and founding the field of evolutionary biology.
 1864. Louis Pasteur disproved the spontaneous generation of cellular life.
 1865. Gregor Mendel demonstrated in pea plants that inheritance follows definite rules. The Principle of Segregation states that each organism has two genes per trait, which segregate when the organism makes eggs or sperm. The Principle of Independent Assortment states that each gene in a pair is distributed independently during the formation of eggs or sperm. Mendel's observations went largely unnoticed.
 1869. Friedrich Miescher discovered nucleic acids in the nuclei of cells.
 1872. Darwin publishes The Expression of the Emotions in Man and Animals.
 1876. Oskar Hertwig and Hermann Fol independently described (in sea urchin eggs) the entry of sperm into the egg and the subsequent fusion of the egg and sperm nuclei to form a single new nucleus.
 1876 Founding of the Société zoologique de France.
 1878. Founding of the Zoological Society of Japan.
 1889. Founding of the National Zoological Park (United States) as part of the Smithsonian Institution in Washington DC.
 1892. Hans Driesch separated the individual cells of a 2-cell sea urchin embryo and shows that each cell develops into a complete individual, thus disproving the theory of preformation and showing that each cell is "totipotent," containing all the hereditary information necessary to form an individual.
 1895. Founding of the International Commission on Zoological Nomenclature the body which continues to govern zoological naming.
 1899. Founding of the Bronx Zoo

20th century

1900–1949
 1900. Three biologists, Hugo de Vries, Carl Correns, Erich von Tschermak, independently rediscovered Mendel's paper on heredity.
 1900. Founding of the Unione Zoologica Italiana.
 1905. William Bateson coined the term "genetics" to describe the study of biological inheritance.
 1906. Founding of the Beijing Zoo.
 1907. Ivan Pavlov demonstrated conditioned responses with salivating dogs.
 1910. Founding of the Saint Louis Zoo.
 1916. Founding of the San Diego Zoo.
 1922. Aleksandr Oparin proposed that the Earth's early atmosphere contained methane, ammonia, hydrogen, and water vapour, and that these were the raw materials for the origin of life.
 1934. Brookfield Zoo founded in Brookfield, Illinois, a suburb of Chicago.
 1935. Konrad Lorenz described the imprinting behavior of young birds.
 1936. Founding of the National Zoological Gardens of Sri Lanka.
 1937. In Genetics and the Origin of Species, Theodosius Dobzhansky applies the chromosome theory and population genetics to natural populations in the first mature work of neo-Darwinism, also called the modern synthesis, a term coined by Julian Huxley.

 1938. A living coelacanth was found off the coast of southern Africa.
 1940. Donald Griffin and Robert Galambos announced their discovery of echolocation by bats.

1950–1999
 1952. American developmental biologists Robert Briggs and Thomas King cloned the first vertebrate by transplanting nuclei from leopard frog embryos into enucleated eggs. More differentiated cells were the less able they are to direct development in the enucleated egg.
 1959. Founding of the National Zoological Park Delhi in New Delhi, India.
 1960. Jane Goodall begins her chimpanzee research.
 1961. Joan Oró found that concentrated solutions of ammonium cyanide in water can produce the nucleotide adenine, a discovery that opened the way for theories on the origin of life.
 1969. Founding of the National Zoo of Malaysia in Selangor.
 1963. Premier of the popular American zoological documentary series Wild Kingdom on the NBC television network. 140 episodes would appear until the series ended in 1988.
 1964. International Union for Conservation of Nature (IUCN) issues its first IUCN Red List of species threatened with extinction.
 1967. John Gurdon used nuclear transplantation to clone an African clawed frog; first cloning of a vertebrate using a nucleus from a fully differentiated adult cell.
 1972. Stephen Jay Gould and Niles Eldredge proposed an idea called "punctuated equilibrium", which states that the fossil record is an accurate depiction of the pace of evolution, with long periods of "stasis" (little change) punctuated by brief periods of rapid change and species formation (within a lineage).
 1973. Passage of the U. S. Endangered Species Act of 1973.
 1980. Founding of PETA, People for the Ethical Treatment of Animals.
 1985 Murder of the primatologist Dian Fossey by poachers.
 1990 American entomologist E. O. Wilson and German entomologist Bert Hölldobler publish The Ants. The next year it will win the Pulitzer Prize for non-fiction, the only zoology textbook ever to do so.
 1996. Dolly the sheep was first clone of an adult mammal.

References

External links
Mc-Graw Hill
Wonders of Nature in the Menagerie of Blauw Jan in Amsterdam, as observed by Jan Velten around 1700
Exotic Animals in Eighteenth-Century Britain
Zoologica Göttingen State and University Library

 
History of zoology